Panama Pasama is a 1968 Indian Tamil-language drama film, directed and produced by K. S. Gopalakrishnan. The film stars Gemini Ganesan and B. Saroja Devi. It was released on 23 February 1968, and had a theatrical run of over 140 days. The film was remade the following year in Hindi as Paisa Ya Pyaar.

Plot

Cast 
Lead actors
Gemini Ganesan as Shankar
B. Saroja Devi as Shanthi
Nagesh as Deva

Male supporting actors
T. K. Bhagavathi as Nagalingam
Sivakumar as Shankar's brother in law
C. R. Parthiban
K. Sarangapani as Kannamma's stepfather
V. S. Raghavan as Shankar's father
K. Kannan as Jambu
Samikkannu as Mesthri

Female supporting actors
S. Varalakshmi as Meenakshi
Vijaya Nirmala as Kannamma
Sundari Bai
Pushpalatha as Shankar's sister
G. Sakunthala
Radhabhai

Soundtrack 
The music was composed by K. V. Mahadevan, while the lyrics were written by Kannadasan. The song "Yelantha Pazham" became controversial since it makes comparisons "between a woman and a ber fruit", but became popular among the masses.

Release and reception 
Panama Pasama was released on 23 February 1968. Kalki negatively reviewed the film, criticising Gopalakrishnan's dialogues and direction. Ananda Vikatan said that though the concept was old, the way it was handled was innovative. The critic concluded that the film had few flaws, and was another testament to Gopalakrishnan's talent. It ran for 140 days at Madurai's Thangam Theatre, then the largest theatre in Asia.

References

External links 
 

1960s Tamil-language films
1968 drama films
1968 films
Films directed by K. S. Gopalakrishnan
Films scored by K. V. Mahadevan
Films with screenplays by K. S. Gopalakrishnan
Indian drama films
Tamil films remade in other languages